Campiglossa floccosa is a species of tephritid or fruit flies in the genus Campiglossa of the family Tephritidae.

Distribution
The species is found in the Virgin Islands.

References

Tephritinae
Insects described in 1928
Diptera of North America